Coleophora protecta is a moth of the family Coleophoridae described by Walsingham in 1907. It is found in Lebanon, Algeria, Morocco and Tunisia.

The larvae feed on Tragacantha armata and Tragacantha karakalensis. They feed on the leaves of their host plant.

References

protecta
Moths of Africa
Moths of Asia
Moths described in 1907